Warsow, also stylized as War§ow, is an open source first-person shooter video game.

Development 
Warsow was first publicly released on June 8, 2005, as an alpha version. The stable version 1.0 was released on July 28, 2012, after 7 years of development.

Warsows codebase is free and open source software, distributed under the terms of the GPLv2 license; it is built upon Qfusion, an advanced modification of the Quake II engine. The artwork and other media were originally licensed under the proprietary Warsow Content License, which allowed the contributors of this media to use the work in a "personal portfolio" but not in any other game. Some assets were later released under the Creative Commons License Attribution-ShareAlike 4.0 International license, while others are under the non-free license CC-BY-ND.

Warsow is loosely based on the E-novel Chasseur de bots by Fabrice Demurger. The novel is the basis of the game's cyberpunk visual style, which is achieved by combining cel-shaded cartoon-like graphics with dark, flashy and dirty textures. Since visual clarity is important in maintaining competitive gameplay, Warsow tries to keep effects minimalistic, clear and visible.

On October 18, 2012, the game was released on GOG.com. Warsow was submitted to Steam Greenlight on February 9, 2013, and was greenlit on September 18.

At the end of 2016, the former main developer of Warsow posted: "2.6 this weekend". As of September, 2022 version 2.6 of the  game has still not been released. 

The game was later forked under the title of Warfork, and is being actively developed as of October 2021 by a different development team. Its code is licensed under the same free license as Warsow, while its assets are a mix of proprietary, CC-BY-SA 3.0 and CC0 licenses.

Gameplay
[[Image:Warsow Screenshot.jpg|left|thumb|200px|A screenshot showing Warsow'''s cel-shaded visual style]]
The very competitive gameplay of Warsow focuses heavily on movement and trickjumps. Many of the tricks in Warsow originate from the Quake series, including circle-jumping, bunny hopping, strafe-jumping, double jumping, ramp-sliding, and rocket jumping, but Warsow also gives players the ability to dash, dodge or wall jump, tricks that were originally possible in Urban Terror. It uses a separate button for most of the special movements, making it easier to use them while doing other things at the same time. The various movement tricks combine to add an extra dimension to the gameplay; as the player's proficiency at moving increases, they are able to collect health, armor and weapons more quickly, and to overpower less capable enemies. The variety and flexibility of the physics has spawned an entire community dedicated to competing on the various Race maps that the game offers.

Reception

Media coverageWarsow was mentioned on Good Game in the episode on 14 April 2008 in a segment listing the best free to play games available. Warsow was reviewed with 8 of 10 by Linux Format in August 2011.

Competitive playWarsow has been accepted as a competition-worthy game by several large online leagues such as the Electronic Sports League and ClanBase.
In addition to acceptance by large leagues, many specialized Warsow cups have emerged. Well-known examples are Bamboocha, a Europe-based Warsow Duel Tourney, and ESW: Warsow, a Japanese Warsow cup. In 2007, several LAN tournaments featuring Warsow have emerged such as Crossfire Devotii Challenge 3, Warsow.nl LAN, and E-Sport Stadium 2007.

Additionally, Warsow has been featured on the German TV-channel GIGA Television several times, namely in GIGA eSports and its sub-shows Skill Sunday and Free For All'' and the Pay TV IPTV station GIGA 2, also produced by Turtle Entertainment.

See also
 List of open source games
List of free and open-source software packages

References

External links
 

2012 video games
Creative Commons-licensed video games
Esports games
First-person shooters
Freeware games
Linux games
MacOS games
Multiplayer and single-player video games
Multiplayer online games
Open-source video games
Shooter video games
Steam Greenlight games
Video games with cel-shaded animation
Windows games